Kelsey Sanders is an American actress and singer. She is best known for the role of Reed Brennan in the web series Private. She was a member of the pop group The Stunners from 2007 to 2009.

Career
In 2009, she starred as Reed Brennan in the teen-oriented webisode series called Private based on the books of the same name by Kate Brian. Her television work includes playing Cheryl in Just Jordan and Wannabe #2, a recurring character in Wizards of Waverly Place.

Filmography

Film

Love Again 2020 Miranda Joseley Film

Television

Web

References

External links
 

American child actresses
American film actresses
American television actresses
Living people
21st-century American actresses
Year of birth missing (living people)